The needletooth cusk (Epetriodus freddyi) is a species of cusk-eel found in the Indian and the western Pacific Ocean where it occurs at depths of .  This species grows to a length of  SL.  It is the only known species of its genus The generic name is a compound of the Greek  meaning "needle" and  meaning "tooth", while the specific name honours the English ichthyologist Norman Bertram “Freddy” Marshall (1915-1996) who worked on deep sea fishes as the British Museum (Natural History).

References

Ophidiidae
Monotypic fish genera
Fish described in 1978